The Pingry School is a coeducational, independent, college preparatory country day school in New Jersey, with a Lower School (K–5) campus in the Short Hills neighborhood of Millburn, and a Middle (6–8) and Upper School (9–12) campus in the Basking Ridge section of Bernards Township. The school was founded in 1861 by John F. Pingry. The school has been accredited by the Middle States Association of Colleges and Schools Commission on Elementary and Secondary Schools since 1998 and is considered one of the most prestigious in the state and country.

The school has an endowment of $86.9 million.

Pingry's 177 full-time faculty have 27 doctorates and half have master's degrees, with an average tenure at Pingry of 13 years. A total of 73% of faculty have advanced degrees.

Niche ranks Pingry 2nd on their list of 2020 Best Schools in New Jersey and 2020 Best Private High Schools in New Jersey.

Student body 
The school currently enrolls 1,129 students; 288 at Short Hills and 841 at Basking Ridge; 270 in the Middle School and 571 in the Upper School. Students come from 100 area communities in twelve counties and over 90 municipalities in New Jersey.

As of the 2017–18 school year, the school had an enrollment of 841 students and 118 classroom teachers (on an FTE basis), for a student–teacher ratio of 7.1:1. The school's student body was 48.5% (408) White, 22.0% (185) two or more races, 18.1% (152) Asian, 9.0% (76) Black and 2.1% (18) Hispanic.

History 
Pingry School was founded by the Reverend John Francis Pingry, a Presbyterian minister, in Elizabeth, New Jersey in 1861 to provide both scholastic training and moral education for boys. The outbreak of the American Civil War that year caused enrollment to dry up at the Pingry Select School for Boys, an academy Pingry had founded in 1854 in Roseville. After learning that Elizabeth's only professional educator had decided to enlist in the Union Army, Pingry moved to Elizabeth where he founded the Pingry School. Although Pingry gave talks on Proverbs and used the Bible for instructional purposes, the school has never been affiliated with any church or denomination.

The school moved from the Elizabeth schoolhouse to the Parker Road Campus in 1893. After Pingry retired in 1893, several headmasters with relatively short tenures held his position.

In 1917, C. Mitchell Froelicher became headmaster, but he was pushed out in 1920 because of his German-sounding name and the anti-German sentiment surrounding World War I. Charles Bertram Newton became the headmaster of the school, and his tenure lasted until 1936. Newton became famous for championing the Country Day School philosophy, and Pingry became a much more modern school under his tenure.

In 1925, the Honor Code was written. It was revised in 1988.

From 1936 to 1961, E. Laurence Springer was headmaster, and his tenure was the longest in Pingry's history. He oversaw the move to Pingry's Hillside Campus. The school moved to the edge of Hillside, New Jersey in 1953.

Early in the 1970s, two important changes occurred. First, Pingry began the transition to a coeducational school. The first female students, who graduated in 1976, were succeeded by other young women who today represent half the student body. Second, Pingry grew again by merging with the Short Hills Country Day School to become a school with grades from kindergarten through grade 12. Today over 250 children attend the Pingry Short Hills Campus. In this period of about twenty years, David C. Wilson and H. Wescott Cunningham each served as headmaster.

In 1983, the school moved to Martinsville, a rural area in the Watchung and Somerset Hills. The campuses are approximately 25 minutes apart, and both are located near the New York metropolitan area, which continues to provide many outside resources to supplement the classroom. The old campus in Hillside is now used as a campus of Kean University. In 2013, the Martinsville location was renamed to "Basking Ridge" in an effort to make it easier to locate the campus using automated mapping tools.

In 1987, John Hanly became headmaster. He served until 2000, and was well-liked and remembered by members of the community. Today, the Hanly Lecture on Ethics and Morality holds his name. John Neiswender became headmaster after Hanly, and served until 2005. Nathaniel Conard was headmaster from July 2005 to mid-2019. In late 2018, the school announced that Matt Levinson, of University Prep in Seattle, would be Head of School after Conard retired in mid-2019. Since Pingry's day, there have been 16 headmasters. Currently, Levinson holds the post, his appointment effective mid-2019.

Pingry School's motto is Maxima reverentia pueris debetur, a Latin phrase literally meaning "the greatest respect is owed to the boys." Since becoming co-educational, the school has modified the motto's translation to "the greatest respect is due to the students."  John Pingry's personal motto, "The fear of the Lord is the beginning of wisdom" (Prov. 1:7), hangs as a sign in the C.B. Newton Library located at the Basking Ridge Campus.

In April 2020, the school received an unspecified amount in federally backed small business loans as part of the Paycheck Protection Program. The school received scrutiny over this loan, which was meant to protect small and private businesses. Treasury Secretary Steven Mnuchin tweeted that the schools should return the money, but Levinson stated they were keeping it, despite having an $80-million-plus endowment, due to the "significant challenges to our ability to serve our community" caused by the pandemic.

In February 2021, Purnell School announced that it would cease operations upon the completion of the 2020-2021 academic year. Later that year, Pingry School paid $5 million for the  campus in Pottersville in Somerset County, which will be used as an extension of its existing campuses.

The Honor Code 
Pingry's Honor Code is as follows:

Violations are judged by the student-run Honor Board. The Honor Code is included on every assignment and assessment, and is followed with strict standards. All students sign the Honor Code at Convocation every year, and are expected to continue to follow the Code upon leaving Pingry.

Academics 
Pingry students can take multivariable calculus, calculus-based statistics, number theory, linear algebra, and discrete mathematics in the math department. English courses are taught entirely with discussion- and project-based methods. The School attracts faculty from various industries, including finance, computer science, and engineering. There are twenty faculty who have been at the school for 25 years or more. The vast majority of faculty have PhDs, EdDs, Master's degrees, or MBAs from schools such as Princeton, MIT, Yale, Columbia, UC Berkeley, Dartmouth, and the University of Pennsylvania.

Pingry has a 1:1 laptop policy.

Pingry's math team has performed very well at the lower, middle, and high school levels. The lower school team got second place at the national mathleague.org competition in 2017. The middle school team also got NJ fourth place in the Mathcounts competition in 2019. The high school math team also participated in many math competitions/tournaments with first place 9th-grade team in the Lehigh University High School Math contest in 2020 and the national 4th place team in Math Majors of America Tournament for High Schools in 2020.

Students at Pingry have done very well in the AMC competition series. The school had 3 AIME qualifiers in 2018, with one being a 7th grader. In 2021, Pingry had 7 AIME qualifiers. The school also had USAJMO qualifiers in 2019 and 2021, 2022. The school had a USAMO qualifier in 2022.

Extracurricular activities 

 Independent Research Team: Selective club of groups working on novel research projects from genetics to microbiology to artificial intelligence, using the school's state of the art labs and technological resources
 QuizBowl: Pingry's Academic team has won and placed at many tournaments, including the National Academic Championship and QUnlimited's QuizNet. They have also emerged victorious at local tournaments. 
 Speech and Debate Team
 Math Club / Team
 Orchestra / Band: All ensembles at Pingry are instructed by professional musicians
 Student Government
 Student Newspaper

Athletics 

The Pingry School Big Blue competes in the Skyland Conference which comprises public and private high schools in Essex, Morris, and Somerset counties in west central New Jersey, and operates under the jurisdiction of the New Jersey State Interscholastic Athletic Association. Pingry is also a member of the New Jersey Independent School Athletic Association. Prior to the NJSIAA's 2010 realignment, the school had previously participated in the Colonial Hills Conference which included public and private high schools covering Essex County, Morris County and Somerset County in west Central Jersey. With 435 students in grades 10-12, the school was classified by the NJSIAA for the 2019–20 school year as Non-Public A for most athletic competition purposes, which included schools with an enrollment of 381 to 1,454 students in that grade range (equivalent to Group I for public schools). The school was classified by the NJSIAA as Non-Public Group III for football for 2018–2020.

The school offers 33 varsity teams, with a total of over 70 teams covering seventh to twelfth grade. Many of the school's athletes have been recognized as athletic scholars, and many have gone on to play for college teams. In addition, the school's facilities include two full-court gymnasiums, a 25-meter indoor pool, a state of the art weight and aerobics room with full-time trainers, athletic training room with full-time staff, full locker rooms for women, men and visiting teams, The Miller Bugliari '52 World Cup Field (which has hosted World Cup practices for the '95 Italian National team, the '02 United States National team, and the '13 Ecuadorian National Team) for soccer and baseball, Parsons Field ( which offers stadium seating, a press-box and a scoreboard with a sound system) for football, lacrosse and track and field events,  total that allow for a cross-country course, 12 tennis courts, and numerous practice fields including the John Taylor Babbitt '07 Memorial Field. The Miller A. Bugliari Athletic Complex was opened in 2017 and includes eight squash courts, two basketball gyms and a weight room.

Facilities 

Pingry added a middle school building, designed by USA Architects and Planners, to the Basking Ridge Campus. In early 2007, Forms I and II (grades 7 and 8) moved into the new building. Grade 6 was moved from the Short Hills campus to this new facility at the beginning of the 2007–2008 school year. The building's most notable feature is its specially designed large common area, which is used by the community as an assembly area and by the students as a place to gather informally. This new building shares the cafeteria, the library, the arts wing, the Student Technology and Publishing Center, and the athletic facilities with the upper school.

The Pingry School's Basking Ridge campus used to have a modern-looking turquoise and pink architecture. The turquoise bricks that used to compose the school's central clock tower were originally supposed to be navy blue, but by the time the incorrectly colored paint arrived it was too late to make a change. The main building was designed by the architecture firm Hardy Holzman Pfeiffer Associates. The building has now completed construction, which involved removing the tiles from the clock tower and replacing them with the type of stones used in the making of the new middle school building mentioned previously. This construction project also involved the repair of the roof.

Sports facilities include the Bristol Gymnasium (competition space), the Hyde & Watson Gymnasium (general purpose), the Beinecke Pool (swimming), a fitness facility (weight room and cardio studio), a multi-sport turf field, tennis courts, an eight-lane track, a football field, a cross country running trail, two baseball diamonds, and numerous fields used for soccer, field hockey, and lacrosse. In January 2017, the Miller A. Bugliari '52 Athletics Center opened, with eight squash courts and the state of the art Greig Family memorial exercise weight and conditioning facility.

Student publications 

 The Pingry Record – school newspaper
 Vital Signs – current events magazine
 Pingry Community Research (PCR) – science journal
 The Bluebook – school yearbook
 Polyglot – foreign language magazine
 The Broken Wreckord – satirical newspaper
 Calliope – a collection showcasing the writing and artistic ability of Pingry School students

Accreditation 

The Pingry School is accredited by the Middle States Association of Colleges and Schools, the National Association of Independent Schools, the New Jersey Association of Independent Schools and the New Jersey Department of Education. The Pingry School is a member of the National Association for College Admission Counseling.

Notable alumni 

 Michael Arrom (class of 2013), keyboardist with Steve Vai, who has appeared on Glee.
 John D. Bates (born 1946, class of 1964), Senior Judge of the U.S. District Court for the District of Columbia
 Hanna Beattie (born 1995), ice hockey forward for the Connecticut Whale in the Premier Hockey Federation.
 Frank Chapot (1932-2016), equestrian who competed at six Olympic Games from 1956 until his final effort in 1976 where he won two silver medals in the Team Show Jumping.
 Mike Chernoff (born , class of 1999), General Manager of the Cleveland Indians
 Michael Chertoff (born 1953), Secretary of United States Department of Homeland Security (2005–2009)
 Buzzy Cohen (born 1985), Jeopardy! champion and guest host, host of The Chase
 William A. Conway (1910–2006), former CEO of Garden State National Bank who missed his last year at Pingry due to illness.
 Mael Corboz (born 1994), professional soccer player who plays as a midfielder for SC Verl.
 Rachel Corboz (born 1996), professional soccer player who plays as a midfielder for Stade de Reims.
 Robert C. Crane (1920–1962), newspaper publisher who was elected to the New Jersey Senate shortly before his death.
 Mark Donohue (1937–1975, class of 1955), race car driver, winner of the 1972 Indianapolis 500 and the 1973 Can-Am Championship
 Paul W. Downs (born 1982), Emmy-Award winning American actor, writer, and director best known for his portrayal of Trey Pucker on the Comedy Central series Broad City.
 Steve Elmendorf (class of 1978), deputy campaign manager for Presidential candidate John Kerry, and longtime campaign aide to Richard Gephardt.
 Willard F. Enteman, the eleventh president of Bowdoin College in Brunswick, Maine.
 Nic Fink (born 1993), Olympic swimmer who specializes in breaststroke events.
 Michelle Friedland (born 1972, class of 1990), United States Circuit Judge of the United States Court of Appeals for the Ninth Circuit.
 Adam Gardner (born 1973, class of 1991), guitarist for the rock band Guster.
 Howard Georgi (born 1947, class of 1964), emeritus professor of physics at Harvard University.
 Adam Goldstein (born 1988, class of 2006), author and founder/CEO of Hipmunk
 Andrew D. Goldstein, prosecutor and the former chief of the public corruption unit of the United States Attorney's Office for the Southern District of New York.
 Benedict Gross (class of 1967), a prominent mathematics professor. 
 Andrew Gruel (born 1980, class of 1998), chef, restaurateur and Food Network celebrity.
 Miguel Gutierrez (born 1971, class of 1989), choreographer.
 William Halsey Jr. (1882–1959), Fleet Admiral in the United States Navy.
 Andrew Horowitz (born 1983, class of 2001), green-tied keyboardist and writer of indie rock band Tally Hall.
 Amos Hostetter Jr. (born 1937, class of 1954), former CEO and founder of MediaOne, billionaire on Forbes Magazine list.
 Joseph E. Irenas (1940–2015, class of 1958), Federal Judge
 Jamie Johnson (born 1979), clothing designer of Black Sweater, documentary film maker, whose documentary films Born Rich and The One Percent appeared on HBO.
 Thomas Kean Jr. (born 1968), member of the United States House of Representatives representing New Jersey's 7th congressional district.
 Dan Kellner (born 1976), Olympic foil fencer.
 Micah Kellner (born 1978, class of 1997), Member of the New York State Assembly.
 James C. Kellogg III (1915–1980, class of 1933), former chairman of the New York Stock Exchange and the Port Authority of New York and New Jersey.
 Andrew Lewis (born 1972, class of 1993), professional soccer player
 N. Gregory Mankiw (born 1958), former chairman of the Council of Economic Advisers and Harvard Professor of Economics.
 Dean Mathey, class of 1908, investor who made millions for Princeton University.
 Thomas N. McCarter (1867–1955), Attorney General of New Jersey from 1902 to 1903, founder and president of PSE&G Corporation, developer of Penn Station in Newark, and original benefactor of the McCarter Theatre in Princeton.
 Robert H. McCarter (1859–1941), Attorney General of New Jersey from 1903 to 1908 and well-known New Jersey lawyer, eventually heading the law firm McCarter & English.
 Andrew McCarthy (born 1962, class of 1980), actor.
 Billy McFarland (born 1991), serial fraudster, convicted felon and founder of the fraudulent Fyre Festival and the fraudulent NYC VIP Access.
 Arthur N. Pierson (1867–1957), politician who served as Speaker of the New Jersey General Assembly and President of the New Jersey Senate.
 Frederick Reiken (born 1966), novelist.
 Ronald C. Rice (born 1968, class of 1986), Newark City Councilman / Candidate for Congress 10th District.
 Jon Sarkin (born 1953, class of 1971), self-taught artist and stroke survivor.
 Robert Schriesheim (born 1960, class of 1978), business executive involved in the restructuring of several American business institutions including Western Union and Sears.
 Dani Shapiro (born 1962), novelist.
 Lee Shelley (born 1956), Olympic épée fencer in 1984 and 1988.
 Gaddis Smith (class of 1950), historian, professor at Yale University for over forty years.
 Todd Solondz (born 1959), filmmaker.
 Charles August Sulzer (1879–1919), delegate to the United States House of Representatives from the Alaska Territory.
 Richard Tregaskis (1916–1973), war correspondent and author of Guadalcanal Diary, the source for the 1943 film of the same name starring William Bendix, Richard Conte, and Anthony Quinn.
 MJ Tyson (born 1986, class of 2004), jewelry designer.
 Carl Van Duyne (1946–1983), sailor who competed in the Finn event at the 1968 Summer Olympics.
 Gillian Vigman (born 1972, class of 1990), actress.

Notable faculty
 Stephen Kovacs (1972–2022), saber fencer and fencing coach, charged with sexual assault, died in prison

Sexual abuse scandal

Initial allegations 

On March 29, 2016, The Pingry School sent a letter to "parents of current students, the entire alumni and school trustees" informing them that the School had "recently learned from a few of our alumni that students were sexually abused by Thad Alton, an employee of Short Hills Country Day School from 1972 to 1974 and, following the merger of the two institutions, an employee of the Pingry School from 1974 to 1978." The letter stated that Pingry had hired a security firm to conduct an investigation on behalf of the school. The letter was signed by Headmaster Nathaniel E. Conard and Jeffrey N. Edwards, chair of the board of trustees.

At that time, Crew Janci LLP, "a law firm that specializes in suing schools and youth organizations for their negligent handling of sexual abuse[,] announced it has been investigating Alton's tenure at Pingry for over a year." Crew Janci LLP's investigation on behalf of the victims was "credited with persuading the 166-year-old [Pingry] school to launch its own investigation[.]" Crew Janci's website made clear that its investigation on behalf of the victims would continue, despite the announcement of the Pingry School's commissioning of an investigation.

On April 1, 2016, The Star-Ledger revealed court documents indicating that Alton had previously been convicted for his sexual abuse of Pingry students. The spokesperson for the Pingry School was quoted as responding to this information by saying: "I'm afraid such a conviction is news to us" and that "[i]t wasn't until recently that the [Pingry] school's current administration knew anything about this situation in the '70s, which prompted us to act[.]"

A news article published on April 8, 2016, detailed how Alton moved from Pingry School in 1978 to The Peck School, "10 miles away in Morristown." The Peck School sent a letter to its alumni explaining "that Alton had nothing but 'positive job references' when he was hired, fresh from six years at the Short Hills Country Day School, which merged with Pingry."

After leaving the Peck School in 1979, Alton continued on as an educator at Clarkson University in Potsdam, New York until he was arrested in December 1989 in relation to his sexual abuse of more than 50 children.

On April 27, 2016, The Star- Ledger ran a report of interviews with several of the victims. Then, on April 28, "Pingry Survivors" – a group of individuals who were sexually abused as children while at Pingry— posted an open letter to the "Pingry Community."

In their open letter, the Pingry Survivors stated their goals as follows: "(1) For the Pingry Community to learn the whole truth about the extent of the problem of child sexual abuse at the Pingry School – including a complete and accurate disclosure about the School's response at the time of the abuse (and since); (2) For The Pingry School to hear, understand, and acknowledge the suffering of each victim and to make meaningful amends; and, (3) For The Pingry School to dedicate itself to ensuring that this history can never be repeated (including an independent review of policies, practices, and culture, as well as implementation of meaningful changes)." The Pingry Survivors went on to say that they "hope that we and the current Pingry School leadership – with the support of the greater Pingry Community – can find a path forward that is collaborative and allows for true healing and reconciliation."

Outcome 

During the year following Pingry's announcement of its investigation in March 2016, the school's child sexual abuse scandal was mentioned in multiple national media reports on private schools with pervasive sexual abuse in their pasts, including Vanity Fair and The New York Times.

On March 28, 2017, The Pingry School released a letter announcing that it had concluded its "independent investigation into the sexual abuse allegations and circumstances surrounding Thad Alton's tenure." The school posted a "Report to the Pingry Community" on a website other than its official page called "www.pingryresponse.org." It is unclear whether the school received a more comprehensive investigative report. The "Report to the Pingry Community" substantiated 27 victims of child sexual abuse by Alton, as well as abuse by other former Pingry faculty and staff.

The school announced that their investigator's report "affirms the abuse by former Pingry teacher and assistant Lower School principal Thad Alton. Pingry's investigative report revealed that at least one "school board member learned of Alton's activities in 1979," but that the Pingry School "never shared the information with its faculty, alumni or the family of its students."

The school acknowledged in its letter that "the culture, structure, and policies of the school... allowed such atrocities to occur in the past." The school asserted:

"[W]e are deeply sorry for the pain the survivors have suffered, and are grateful to them for coming forward. In our commitment to ongoing efforts to fully understand and address these troubling events in Pingry's past, we will be engaging with survivors to learn how we can best support them. Our hope is to heal as a community and continue to foster the culture of safety and well-being that our students deserve.  This healing requires our continued partnership, collaboration, and candor."

In the days after the release of the Pingry School's report, victims of abuse at Pingry went to the media with their stories about the abuse and the impact it had on their lives. In some of those media reports, the "Pingry Survivors" group asserted "their school knew what was going on" with the abuse at the time it was occurring.

Alton has never been criminally prosecuted for his sexual abuse of most of the Pingry victims. He lives in Manhattan and is a registered sex offender in the State of New York.

On December 4, 2017, an article appeared on the front page of The New York Times detailing Pingry's attempts to invoke to statute of limitations to avoid compensating former students who were victims of sexual abuse at the school.

References

External links 

 The Pingry School official website
 College profile for the class of 2008
 Pingry School Overview
 WSJ High School Rankings
 Pingry School, National Center for Education Statistics

1861 establishments in New Jersey
Bernards Township, New Jersey
Educational institutions established in 1861
Hillside, New Jersey
Middle States Commission on Secondary Schools
New Jersey Association of Independent Schools
Preparatory schools in New Jersey
Private elementary schools in New Jersey
Private high schools in Somerset County, New Jersey
Private middle schools in New Jersey
Schools in Union County, New Jersey